is a Japanese footballer currently studying at the Kwansei Gakuin University.

Career statistics

Club

Notes

References

External links

2001 births
Living people
Association football people from Osaka Prefecture
Kwansei Gakuin University alumni
Japanese footballers
Association football midfielders
J3 League players
Cerezo Osaka players
Cerezo Osaka U-23 players